The California state elections, June 2010 were held on June 8, 2010 and included five propositions and two special elections, one for a State Senate seat and the other for a State Assembly seat. Primary elections for all statewide offices, a seat to the United States Senate, all Californian seats to the House of Representatives, all of the seats of the State Assembly, and all even-numbered seats of the State Senate, along with the first round election for the nonpartisan Superintendent of Public Instruction were also held.


Propositions

Proposition 13 

Proposition 13 is a legislatively referred constitutional amendment prohibiting the reassessment of property values due to seismic retrofitting work.

Proposition 14 

Proposition 14 is an initiative statute establishing nonpartisan blanket primaries.

Proposition 15 

Proposition 15 is an initiative statute creating a public campaign finance system for Secretary of State elections.

Proposition 16 

Proposition 16 is an initiative constitutional amendment requiring a two-thirds majority to establish or expand public electricity providers.

Proposition 17 

Proposition 17 is an initiative statute allowing auto insurance companies to charge based on continuity of insurance coverage.

Special elections

37th State Senate district special election 

The seat of the 37th State Senate district was vacated by John J. Benoit after he was appointed to be Riverside County supervisor on November 30, 2009.

Primary election 
A primary election was held on April 13, 2010. Since no candidate won a majority, the candidates with the top votes for each party appeared on the ballots for the special election.

Special election

43rd State Assembly district special election 

The seat of the 43rd State Assembly district was vacated by Paul Krekorian after he was elected to the Los Angeles City Council on December 8, 2009.

Primary election 
A primary election was held on April 13, 2010. Since no candidate won a majority, the candidates with the top votes for each party appeared on the ballots for the special election.

Special election

See also 
List of California ballot propositions
2010 California gubernatorial election
2010 United States Senate election in California
2008 California elections

References

External links 
California Elections and Voter Information

California 06